Male Call is an American comic strip series created and drawn by Milton Caniff on a volunteer basis, exclusively for US military publications during World War II. The strip began January 24, 1943. Caniff continued Male Call until seven months after V-J Day, bringing it to a conclusion on March 3, 1946.

Spin-off strip
To contribute to the war effort, Caniff decided to draw a weekly comic strip and make it available at no cost to military camp newspapers. The Camp Newspaper Service was launched to syndicate Caniff's weekly page and contributions from other civilians. For CNS, Caniff created a unique version of his Terry and the Pirates, completely different in content from his regular daily and Sunday strips for the Chicago Tribune Syndicate. It premiered October 11, 1942. Minus Terry, the CNS version focused on beautiful adventuress Burma, and she was seen in single-page situations rather than a continuity storyline. After three months, however, The Miami Herald objected to this competing use of the character and complained to the Tribune Syndicate. The military spin-off version of Terry and the Pirates came to an end on January 10, 1943.

Characters and story
To launch Male Call two weeks later, Caniff introduced a new character, Miss Lace, a sexy, sophisticated, dark-haired woman who mixed with the American G.I.'s (seldom officers) at various locales.  The strip was a gag-a-week series aimed at boosting the morale of servicemen and was oriented towards mild humor and pin-up art. Though Miss Lace was often featured, she was not in every strip, and many strips featured one-off gags about an aspect of military life in which only military personnel are seen.  Given its reading demographic, the content of Male Call was somewhat racier than was permitted in mainstream civilian publications. Nevertheless, the strip still had to pass muster with military censors.

Miss Lace was the certainly the most well-remembered aspect of Male Call, and she does appear in a little over half the strips.  A statuesque brunette with a penchant for wearing elegant but decidedly revealing clothing, Miss Lace was a definite male fantasy figure who was seemingly well-off and respectable, but was also unattached and accommodating.  She believed it her duty to improve morale and thus consorted freely with American G.I.'s, all of whom she called "General", regardless of rank.  Though Miss Lace would fend off the advances of those who were too forward—sometimes with a formidable punch in the face—she could be friendly and even somewhat forward herself with G.I.s who approached her with respect, and she never lacked for male attention.  One strip describes Miss Lace as "sorta every G.I.'s chick ... you might run into her on a pass into town almost anywhere ... Darwin, Belfast, Algiers, Kunming, Boston, Fort Worth, Seattle, Kodiak, Indianapolis ... wherever you hope to have a good time."

[[File:Lace Male Call.jpg|right|thumb|500px|Milton Caniff's "Miss Lace", the central character of Male Call.  This later drawing by Caniff post-dates the strip, and is more risque than military censors would allow during Male Call'''s original run.]]

Almost no details were offered about Miss Lace's backstory, and she even point-blank refused to divulge to anyone whether "Lace" was her first or last name.  She traveled, and apparently lived with, an unnamed Asian maid who was a very occasionally recurring character; where Miss Lace came from or how she maintained her lifestyle was never addressed.  It was strongly implied, however, that Miss Lace was quasi-magical, a fantasy willed to life to help American soldiers win the war.  Particularly sympathetic to enlisted men, she could suddenly appear at dances or in trenches, and was seemingly impervious to the realities of combat or of war material shortages.  In the final strip, published after the war, Miss Lace left a note saying her mission was accomplished.  She then simply vanished, never to be seen again.

Comics historian Don Markstein described the Male Call characters:

Miss Lace herself was inspired by Norman Pett's comic strip Jane, published in the British tabloid The Daily Mirror from 1932 to 1959.

Caniff would first produce a strip that was done with line drawings only, and no heavy inks.  This would then be sent to the military censor who would either approve it, send it back with suggested changes, or in a dozen or so instances over the course of strip's history, reject it outright.  Once approved, a stencil would be made of the line drawn copy, and the original sent back to Caniff, who would then apply more inks.  The stencil version would be sent to camps which ran their local paper off on mimeograph machines, while the inked version would go to those that had actual newspaper presses.  Caniff had said that he invested nearly as much time into each weekly Male Call installment as he did a week's worth of episodes of Terry and the Pirates.  In addition, he donated his time and talents to drawing hundreds of original unit insignia from all branches of the military.

The Camp Newspaper Service distributed the strip to more than 3000 military base newspapers, the largest number of individual papers in which any single comic strip has appeared.  Male Call did not appear in any civilian newspapers.

In 1987, Kitchen Sink Press published a complete collection, .

In 2011, Hermes Press published a complete reprint of the comic strip.

Cultural legacy
Beginning in 1995, Dargaud published a comics series entitled Pin-Up, aimed mainly at adults, written by Yann Le Pennetier and drawn by Philippe Berthet. The series tells the adventures of Dottie Partington who models for Milton, an artist who has been commissioned to draw a strip to raise the morale of the troops. He comes up with Poison Ivy'', a strip-within-a-strip, in which the titular character is a combination of Lace and Mata Hari.

References

Adult comic strips
American comic strips
Comics spin-offs
1943 comics debuts
Comics characters introduced in 1943
Erotic comics
1946 comics endings